Glince (or Gleinitz bei Waitsch) is a former settlement in central Slovenia in the southwest part of the capital Ljubljana. It belongs to the Vič District of the City Municipality of Ljubljana. It is part of the traditional region of Upper Carniola and is now included with the rest of the municipality in the Central Slovenia Statistical Region.

Geography
Glince lies at the confluence of Glinščica Creek with the Gradaščica River. The soil is loamy and was formerly used for agriculture, but this was converted to urban use before the Second World War.

Name
The name Glince is originally an accusative plural derived from the Slavic common noun *glinьnica 'clay pit', based on the word glina 'clay'. It therefore refers to the local geography. The settlement was known as Gleinitz or Gleinitz bei Waitsch in German in the past.

History
Glince was originally a farming settlement consisting of only a few houses. A tobacco factory operated in Glince at the end of the 18th century, predating the tobacco factory further east on Trieste Street; it was last mentioned in 1804. The population of Glince grew rapidly before the Second World War. The village had a population of 1,593 people living in 115 houses in the 1900 census, and 2,189 people in 185 houses in 1931. By 1937 it had largely become part of the metropolitan area of Ljubljana with extensive housing and administrative buildings along Trieste Street, as well as commercial buildings and industrial plants (producing chemicals, screws, oxygen, yeast, liquid malt extract, and bottle caps). Along with the entire former Municipality of Vič, Glince was annexed by the City of Ljubljana in 1935, ending its existence as an independent settlement.

Until renaming in 1939, the former Glince street system extended from Šumar Street (formerly 1st-A Street, Glince, cesta Ia) in the east to Shelter Street (formerly 17th Street, Glince, cesta XVII) in the west, and from Kogej and Gorkič streets ( and Gorkičeva ulica, formerly 2nd Street, Glince, cesta II) in the north to Redelonghi Street (formerly 12th Street, Glince, cesta XII) in the south.

Gallery

References

External links

Glince on Geopedia (unlabeled)

Localities of the Vič District
Former settlements in Slovenia